The Royal Library in Copenhagen is the national library of Denmark and the university library of the University of Copenhagen. It is among the largest libraries in the world and the largest in the Nordic countries. In 2017, it merged with the State and University Library in Aarhus to form a combined national library. The combined library organisation (the separate library locations in Copenhagen and Aarhus are maintained) is known as the Royal Danish Library.

It contains numerous historical treasures, and a copy of all works printed in Denmark since the 17th century are deposited there. Thanks to extensive donations in the past, the library holds nearly all known Danish printed works back to and including the first Danish books, printed in 1482 by Johann Snell.

History
The library was founded in 1648 by King Frederik III, who contributed a comprehensive collection of European works. It was opened to the public in 1793.

In 1989, it was merged with the prestigious Copenhagen University Library (founded in 1482) (UB1). In 2005, it was merged with the Danish National Library for Science and Medicine (UB2), now the Faculty Library of Natural and Health Sciences. The official name of the organization as of 1 January 2006 is The Royal Library, the National Library of Denmark and the Copenhagen University Library. In 2008, the Danish Folklore Archive was merged with the Royal Library.

Librarians
The first librarian was Marcus Meibom, followed 1663-1671 by Peder Griffenfeld. Later librarians included J. H. Schlegel, Jon Erichsen, Daniel Gotthilf Moldenhawer (1787-1823 notorious for stealing numerous books to enrich the library collections) and Chr. Bruun. Since 1900 the former librarians are H.O. Lange (1901-1924), Carl S. Petersen (1924-1943), Svend Dahl (1943-1952), Palle Birkelund (1952-1982), Torkil Olsen (1982-1986), Erland Kolding Nielsen (1986-2017), followed by the present Director General Svend Larsen.

Items collected 
Books, journals, newspapers, pamphlets and corporate publications, manuscripts and archives, maps, prints and photographs, music scores, documentation of folkways and popular traditions, four annual electronic copies of the Danish Internet by legal deposit.

As of 2017, there Royal Library had 36,975,069 physical units and
2,438,978 electronic titles. The online catalogue, in combination with the reading room, is still our patron's most direct form of access to our collections.

The Royal Library today
Today, The Royal Library has five sites: The main library at Slotsholmen, Copenhagen harbour (in the Black Diamond), covering all subjects and special collections; one at Nørre Alle, Faculty Library of Natural and Health Sciences; one at Gothersgade, central Copenhagen, Faculty Library of Social Sciences; one at Amager, Faculty Library of Humanities; and, one in Studiestræde, central Copenhagen, The Faculty of Law Library. The annual circulation is 11,400,000 loans (10,900,000 of these are electronic loans). The members are 32,196 active users. The annual budget: 394M Danish Kroner (58M US Dollars), including building expenses and maintenance.

The library is open to anyone above the age of 18 with a genuine need to use the collections. Special rules apply for use of rare and valuable items.

Buildings at the Slotsholmen site
The old building of the Slotsholmen site was built in 1906 by Hans Jørgen Holm. The central hall is a copy of Charlemagne's Palace chapel in the Aachen Cathedral. The building is still being used by the library.
In 1999, a new building adjacent to the old one was opened at Slotsholmen, known as the Black Diamond. The Black Diamond building was designed by Danish architects schmidt hammer lassen. Named for its outside cover of black marble and glass, the Black Diamond building houses a concert hall in addition to the library.

The Black Diamond is formed by two black cubes that are slightly tilted over the street. In between, there is an eight-storey atrium whose walls are white and wave-shaped, with a couple of transversal corridors that link both sides, and balconies on every floor. The atrium's exterior wall is made of glass; so, you can see the sea; and, on the opposite shore, you can see Christianshavn's luxury buildings.

Three bridges connect the Black Diamond with the old part of the Royal Library; those three bridges (two small ones for internal transport and a big one with the circulation desk) go over the road. At the ceiling of the big bridge, there is a huge painting by Danish painter Per Kirkeby.

Significant holdings
The Royal Library acquires Danish books through legal deposit. The holdings include an almost complete collection of all Danish printed books back from 1482. In 2006, legal deposit was extended to electronic publications and now the library harvests four electronic copies of the Danish Internet each year. Danish books printed before 1900 are digitized on demand and made freely available to the public. As the National library, RDL has vast collections of digital material (Danish net archive, digitized radio and TV and newspapers etc.) which are relevant for scholars in many fields. The library also holds a large and significant collection of old foreign scholarly and scientific literature, including  precious books of high value and of importance for book history, including a rare copy of the Gutenberg Bible.

The library holds treasures which are inscribed on UNESCO's Memory of the World Register: A collection of about 2,000 books by and about Carl Linné (1997); the manuscripts and correspondence of Hans Christian Andersen (1997); the Søren Kierkegaard Archives (manuscripts and personal papers) (1997); Guamán Poma de Ayala's El Primer Nueva Coronica y Buen Gobierno, an autographed manuscript of 1,200 pages including 400 full-page drawings depicting the indigenous point of view on pre-conquest Andean life and Inca rule, the Spanish conquest in 1532, early Spanish colonial rule, and the systematic abuse of the rights of the indigenous population (2007). Biblia Latina. Commonly called the Hamburg Bible or the Bible of Bertoldus  (MS. GKS 4 2°), a richly illuminated Bible in three very large volumes made for the Cathedral of Hamburg in 1255. The 89 illuminated initials in the book are unique both as expressions of medieval art and as sources to the craft and history of the medieval book. (2011);

Other treasures are the Copenhagen Psalter, the Dalby Gospel Book, the Angers fragment (parts of Denmark's first national chronicle), and maps of the Polar Region. The library also holds important collections of Icelandic manuscripts, primarily in Den gamle kongelige samling (The Old Royal Collection) and Den nye kongelige samling (The New Royal Collection). Denmark's most outstanding Icelandic collection, the Arnamagnæan Manuscript Collection, is however not a holding of The Royal Library but of the University of Copenhagen.

In 2010, the library acquired the 14th-century Courtenay Compendium at auction.

Book thefts
Between 1968 and 1978, the library saw one of the largest book thefts in Denmark's history. 3,200 books and document worth up to $50 million USD were stolen by an employee from the library. The theft remained undetected until 1975. Between 1998 and 2002, the thief succeeded in selling books worth about $2 million at various auctions. The case was finally solved in September 2003, after a stolen book had surfaced at Christie's auction house in London. The thief, a director of the library's oriental department named Frede Møller-Kristensen, had died in January 2003. His family then became careless in selling the remaining books. At a coordinated raid of the family's homes in Germany and Denmark in November 2003, some 1,500 books were recovered. In June 2004, his wife, son, daughter-in-law and a family friend were sentenced to prison terms ranging from 18 months to three years; Eva Moeller-Kristensen, the 69-year-old widow, was sentenced in Copenhagen's City Court to three years in prison, Thomas Moller-Kristensen, his 42-year-old son, got two years; Silke Albrecht, his 33-year-old daughter-in-law, and Patrick Adam Peters, a friend, each received 18 months; the friend was acquitted on appeal. In April 2005, a daughter of the thief was also found guilty. The library maintains a list of missing books.

See also
Royal Library Garden, Copenhagen

References

External links

 (in English)
The European Library - Combined access to 48 national libraries in Europe
Bibliotek.dk - Danish Internet portal for all Danish libraries

 
1648 establishments in Denmark
Culture in Copenhagen
Deposit libraries
Education in Copenhagen
Individual thefts
Libraries established in 1648
Libraries in Copenhagen
Denmark
Library buildings completed in 1906